For other persons with the same name, see Theagenes (disambiguation)

Theagenes was a historical writer, of uncertain date. Stephanus of Byzantium frequently quotes from a work of his, entitled Macedonica (s. v. Altus (Mygdonia) ), as also from another entitled Carica. It is, perhaps, the same Theagenes, who wrote a work on Aegina, quoted by John Tzetzes. He is one of the authors (= FGrHist 774) whose fragments were collected in Felix Jacoby's Fragmente der griechischen Historiker.

References

Ancient Greek historians known only from secondary sources